Alexandra Ludomila Ribeiro Fernandes Leitão (born April 8, 1973) is a Portuguese jurist and professor of law.

Biography
She was the Assistant Secretary of State for Education in the XXI Constitutional Government and Minister for the Modernization of the State and Public Administration in the XXII Constitutional Government.

She graduated in law from the Faculty of Law of the University of Lisbon in 1995, having completed a Master's in Legal and Political Sciences from the same Faculty in 2001, and a Doctorate in 2011. She worked as an Assistant at the Faculty of Law of the University from Lisbon between 1996 and 2011, and as Assistant Professor since 2011.

She joined the Socialist Party in 1995, having been active in the Socialist Youth since 1991.

Between 1997 and 1999 she was assistant to the Cabinet of the Secretary of State for the Presidency of the Council of Ministers of the XIII Constitutional Government of Portugal. She worked as a consultant for the Legal Center of the Presidency of the Council of Ministers (CEJUR) between 1999 and 2009, which she took over in 2011, becoming Deputy Director of CEJUR between 2009 and 2011. She was also a member of the Advisory Board of the Attorney General of the Republic between 2011 and 2015.

References

Living people
1973 births
Portuguese jurists
21st-century Portuguese politicians
21st-century Portuguese women politicians
Government ministers of Portugal
Women government ministers of Portugal
University of Lisbon alumni
Academic staff of the University of Lisbon